The Hanging Sun is a 2022 Italian-British noir thriller film directed by Francesco Carrozzini. It is an adaptation of the 2015 novel Midnight Sun by Jo Nesbø.

The film had its world premiere as the closing film of the 79th Venice International Film Festival on 10 September 2022.

Premise
John (Alessandro Borghi) is on the run after betraying his powerful crime boss father (Peter Mullan). He travels north to evade his brother (Frederick Schmidt) and takes refuge in an isolated village. The village is a small community of strict religious conformists. John grows close to a woman with a troubled past named Lea (Jessica Brown Findlay), becoming a father figure to her son Caleb (Raphael Vicas). The two must find a way to break the ties to their past and start over.

Cast
 Alessandro Borghi as John
 Jessica Brown Findlay as Lea
 Sam Spruell as Aaron and Nicolas
 Frederick Schmidt as Michael
 Raphael Vicas as Caleb
 Peter Mullan as Dad
 Charles Dance as Jacob

Production
A Sky Original film, The Hanging Sun is a U.K.-Italian co-production by Sky Studios, ITV Studios' Cattleya Producciones and Groenlandia.

Release
The first trailer for the film was released on 31 August 2022. The film was chosen as the closing film of the 79th Venice International Film Festival, presented out of competition, and premiered on 10 September 2022. It was theatrically released in Italy on 12 September 2022.

Reception
Anna Smith of Deadline called the film "a workable and good-looking thriller".

Davide Abbatescianni of Cineuropa said "Carrozzini successfully transposes a captivating story about hate and toxic family relationships to the big screen, assembling an effective cast and lending the movie great pace."

Jonathan Romney of Screen Daily called the film a "bizarre mess from start to finish", criticizing the "oddness" of the accents employed by Borghi and others. Romney praised the performances of Dance and Mullan, but criticized the casting of Vicas and lamented that Brown Findlay's role was "largely restricted to being dourly long-suffering."

References

External links
 

2022 films
British thriller films
Italian thriller films
Films based on crime novels
Films based on Norwegian novels
Films based on works by Jo Nesbø
2020s Italian films